El Gráfico is a Salvadoran sports newspaper and the first of its kind founded in Central America.  The newspapers target audience is males aged 13 to 45. El Gráfico is published daily as a morning edition in Spanish and reports on national and international sports. The newspaper is based in Antiguo Cuscatlán.

The name El Gráfico goes back to a newspaper that was founded by Pepe and José Roberto Dutriz in 1939. Today's sports newspaper first appeared in 2004 and currently has a circulation of around 50,000 copies a day. It is distributed all over El Salvador. The editorial team consists of around 20 full-time editors and six sports photographers. The editor-in-chief is Daniel Herrera.

External links
 Official website

References

2004 establishments in El Salvador
Newspapers published in El Salvador
Newspapers established in 2004
Spanish-language newspapers